Simeon Burt Wolbach (3 July 1880 – 19 March 1954) was an American pathologist, researcher, teacher, and journal editor who elucidated the infection vectors for Rocky Mountain spotted fever and epidemic typhus. He was president of the American Association of Pathologists and Bacteriologists and of the American Society for Experimental Pathology.

Born the son of banker Samuel N. Wolbach and Rosa Stein, he was raised in a Jewish home in rural Nebraska in the wild west era. He went east to study in Boston and remained there most of his life. He married Anna F. Wellington in 1914 and had three children.

Education
Harvard Lawrence Scientific School, then Harvard Medical School M.D. 1903
Boston City Hospital postgraduate studies in pathology with Frank Burr Mallory and William T. Councilman 1903-05

Career
In 1905, he returned to Harvard Medical School to work in pathology as an assistant under Councilman, while he was also the pathologist to the Boston Lying-In Hospital and the Long Island chronic care hospital. Three years later he became the director of Bender Hygienic Laboratory (today part of St. Peter's Healthcare) in Albany, New York, while an adjunct professor and department head of pathology and bacteriology at Albany Medical College.  He spent 1909 at Montreal General Hospital and McGill University, then in 1910 returned to Harvard's Department of Bacteriology under Harold Clarence Ernst|Harold C. Ernst. In 1914 he became an associate professor of pathology and bacteriology there, then in 1922 was made the head of pathology, occupying the chair as Shattuck Professor of Pathological Anatomy. From 1922 to 47 he was at Peter Bent Brigham Hospital and Children's Hospital of Boston as chief of pathology.
In 1938 he was elected to the National Academy of Sciences.

Research
Wolbach's early research was into the effects of radiation on skin with Porter. Later field work in Africa got him interested in tropical parasitology.

Working with McGill parasitologist John L. Todd, they carried uninfected lice (feeding them on their persons) to Poland in 1920 in order to demonstrate that lice transmit Rickettsia prowazekii, the organism which causes epidemic typhus. For this work he received the rank of Commander in the Order of Polonia Restituta.  
Wolbach turned his attention to childhood development and vitamin deficiencies. Working with J.M. Coppoletta at Brigham and Children's, he developed tables of weights of vital organs for different ages and body lengths which became a definitive reference for pediatric pathology.

Publications

Further reading

References

External links
 

1880 births
1954 deaths
Members of the United States National Academy of Sciences
Harvard Medical School faculty
American pathologists
American medical researchers
Harvard School of Engineering and Applied Sciences alumni
Harvard Medical School alumni
People from Grand Island, Nebraska